The Cruise of the Make-Believes is a lost 1918 American silent dramatic feature film starring Lila Lee in her first motion picture. It was directed by George Melford and is based on a 1907 novel by Tom Gallon. Famous Players-Lasky produced and Paramount Pictures released.

The film was released at the height of the 1918 flu pandemic.

Plot
As described in a film magazine, Bessie Meggison lives in the slums with her drunken father Daniel Meggison and presides over a boarding house. Gilbert Byfield, a wealthy youth who is writing a book, lives nearby in a cheap room. He becomes acquainted with Bessie and together they sail on many imaginary voyages on an improvised yacht in her back yard. Gilbert gives her father permission to take Bessie to his estate in the country for a month's vacation. Daniel Meggison invites his slum friends and drinks to his heart's content while Bessie entertains dozens of urchins. Gilbert returns and learns that Meggison has told Bessie that the estate belongs to him. Gilbert is also confronted by his fiance, and Bessie realizes that all of her family wealth is a sham. Heartbroken, she returns to her slum home. Gilbert finds her on the make believe ship and promises her that her dream of riches will come true.

Cast
Lila Lee as Bessie Meggison
Harrison Ford as Gilbert Byfield
Raymond Hackett as Daniel Meggison
William Brunton as Aubrey Meggison
J. Parks Jones as Jordan Tant (credited as Park Jones)
Spottiswoode Aitken as Simon Quarle
Bud Duncan as Uncle Ed
Eunice Murdock Moore as Aunt Julia (credited as Eunice Moore)
Mayme Kelso as Mrs. Ewart Crane (credited as Maym Kelso)
Nina Byron as Enid Crane
William McLaughlin as Saloon Proprietor
Jane Wolfe as Byfield's Landlady (credited as Jane Wolff)
John McKinnon as Butler of Dream Valley

See also
The Truth About Spring (1965), a similar-themed movie from the 1960s about coming of age

References

External links

Newspaper advertisement article
Press release with photographs from the production
Gallon, Tom (1907), The Cruise of the Make-Believes, Boston: Little, Brown, and Co., on the Internet Archive

American silent feature films
Films directed by George Melford
Lost American films
Films based on British novels
Paramount Pictures films
1918 drama films
American black-and-white films
Silent American drama films
1918 lost films
Lost drama films
1910s American films